Paadatha Thenikkal is a 1988 Indian Tamil-language film, directed by V. M. C. Haneefa, starring Sivakumar and Raadhika. This is a remake of the Malayalam film Sandarbham.

Plot

Cast 
Sivakumar
Raadhika
Sujitha
S. S. Chandran
Manorama
Sripriya

Soundtrack 
Song lyrics were penned by Vaali.

Reception 
The Indian Express wrote "its again a melodrama, without the sentiment not being laid too thick". Jayamanmadhan of Kalki appreciated the screenplay for being clear and not confusing.

References

External links 
 

1980s Tamil-language films
1988 films
Films directed by Cochin Haneefa
Films scored by Ilaiyaraaja
Films with screenplays by M. Karunanidhi
Indian drama films
Tamil remakes of Malayalam films